The Pointe de l'Au is a mountain of the Swiss Chablais Alps, located north of Champéry in the canton of Valais.

References

External links
 Pointe de l'Au on Hikr

Mountains of the Alps
Mountains of Valais
Mountains of Switzerland
Two-thousanders of Switzerland